Scott Schneider is a former Republican member of the Indiana Senate, representing the 30th District from 2009 to 2016. He attended Indiana Wesleyan University. Schneider served two terms on the Indianapolis City–County Council from 1999 to 2007. He succeeded his father, William Schneider, on the City Council. Schneider was succeeded by Christine Scales. He has been working as the VP of Sales and Marketing at Mister Ice of Indianapolis, Inc. since 1989.

Schneider supported a bill that would have allowed creationism to be taught along with evolutionary biology in Indiana public schools. He also authored a bill to stop federal money from going to Planned Parenthood of Indiana. In 2012 Schneider led an effort to get anti-union "right to work" legislation enacted in Indiana. In 2015 Schneider was an author of and voted for Indiana SB 101.

Schneider issued a press release on September 12, 2015, announcing that he would not be seeking re-election once his term ended in 2016

References

External links
Virtual Office of Senator Scott Schneider official Indiana State Legislature site
 
Scott Schneider at Ballotpedia

Year of birth missing (living people)
Living people
Politicians from Indianapolis
Indiana Wesleyan University alumni
Indianapolis City-County Council members
Republican Party Indiana state senators
21st-century American politicians